Tina St. John (born 1966 in Michigan, United States), is an author of historical and paranormal romance novels. As Tina St. John she wrote seven historical romances, and under the pseudonym Lara Adrian she currently writes the New York Times and #1 internationally bestselling Midnight Breed vampire series of paranormal romances, published by Random House Books.

Biography
Tina St. John was born on 1967 in Michigan, USA. She is a descendant of Mayflower passenger Governor William Bradford. She currently resides with her husband in coastal New England.

She left a career in corporate administration to become a full-time writer in 1995, and sold her first-completed novel to Ballantine (Random House) in January 1998. She signs her historical romances as Tina St. John, and her popular series of vampires, Midnight Breed, under the pseudonym Lara Adrian. Her seven out-of-print historical romance novels were reissued in 2012 by the author as independently published ebooks and trade paperbacks.

Past recognitions include being awarded "Bestselling Debut Author of 2007" from Borders Books for Kiss of Midnight and "One of Amazon.com's Top 10 Best Romance Novels of 2007" with Midnight Awakening.

Her writing influences include Bram Stoker and Anne Rice.

Bibliography

As Tina St. John

Debut novel (stand-alone story)
Lord of Vengeance (June 1999; reissued by author March 2012)

Warrior Trilogy (in reading order)
White Lion's Lady (August 2001; reissued by author May 2012)
Black Lion's Bride (May 2002; reissued by author May 2012)
Lady of Valor (April 2000; reissued by author May 2012)

Dragon Chalice Series (paranormal historical romance)
Heart of the Hunter (June 2004; reissued by author March 2012)
Heart of the Flame (March 2005; reissued by author March 2012)
Heart of the Dove (December 2005; reissued by author March 2012)
Heart of the Dragon (uncontracted; forthcoming TBA)

As Lara Adrian

The Midnight Breed series
Kiss of Midnight (May 1, 2007)
Kiss of Crimson (May 29, 2007)
Midnight Awakening (November 27, 2007)
Midnight Rising (March 25, 2008)
Veil of Midnight (December 30, 2008)
Ashes of Midnight (May 26, 2009)
Shades of Midnight (December 29, 2009)
Taken by Midnight (September 28, 2010)
Deeper Than Midnight (June 28, 2011)
A Taste of Midnight (December 5, 2011) [novella]
Darker After Midnight (January 24, 2012)
Edge of Dawn (February 26, 2013)
The Midnight Breed Series Companion (P.B - June 26, 2013, E-Book - May 29, 2013 )
Marked by Midnight
Crave the Night (January 16, 2014)
Tempted by Midnight - 1001 Dark Nights
Bound to Darkness (November 17, 2015)
Stroke of Midnight - 1001 Dark Nights
Defy the Dawn
 Claimed in Shadows
 Break the Day

Midnight Breed Novella
A Touch of Midnight ebook (December 5, 2011)

References and sources

1966 births
Date of birth missing (living people)
Living people
21st-century American novelists
American romantic fiction writers
American women novelists
Novelists from Michigan
21st-century American women writers